Livoq Lake or Livoč Lake (/Livočko jezero) is a small artificial lake in eastern Kosovo. Livoq Lake is just west of the large city of Gjilan and borders the Gollak mountains to its west. The lake is fed by a small tributary of the South Morava. It is the second largest lake in the east of Kosovo only coming second to Prilepnica Lake.

To conceal their crimes, the killers dismembered the bodies and threw them into nearby dumpsters and this lake.

References

External links 

Lakes of Kosovo